The Federal Dam is a manmade dam built across the Hudson River in the U.S. state of New York from Troy on the east bank to Green Island on the west bank. The major function of the dam is to improve navigability. It is located at mile 153 of the Hudson River, measuring from the beginning of the Hudson as a Federally Navigable Waterway near the Battery in Manhattan.  The location of the dam marks the upper end of the Hudson River estuary.

The Federal Lock

In order to allow ships to move freely, the eastern end of the dam contains a lock, commonly called the Federal Lock or (on some charts and publications) the "Troy-US Lock." Although it is the first lock encountered by vessels passing from the Hudson River into the Great Lakes by way of the New York State Canal System, and it is sometimes referred to as lock "E-1," it is not part of the Erie Canal (which officially has no "Lock 1"), nor maintained by the New York State Canal Corporation. Both the lock and the dam were built and are currently operated by the U.S. Army Corps of Engineers; as of September 2006, it was listed as being in "Operational" condition.

See also
List of reservoirs and dams in New York

Dams in New York (state)
Hudson River
Buildings and structures in Albany County, New York
Buildings and structures in Rensselaer County, New York
Transportation buildings and structures in Rensselaer County, New York
Transportation buildings and structures in Albany County, New York
United States Army Corps of Engineers dams
Dams completed in 1916
1916 establishments in New York (state)
Erie Canal